South Bay is a city in Palm Beach County, Florida, United States. It is the westernmost municipality in the South Florida metropolitan area. The population was 4,876 at the 2010 census. As of 2018, the population recorded by the U.S. Census Bureau was 5,185. While the current estimates place South Bay's population in the incorporated city limits at more than 4,000 people, surrounding areas increase the population figures to 54,000 people in a  radius and more than 1.4 million in a  radius.

History
South Bay was named for its location on Lake Okeechobee. The town was incorporated in 1941. The first mayor of South Bay was Aubrey (a.k.a. "Orb") Walker, who, along with his brother, Haughty D. Walker (a.k.a. "Haught"), survived the great hurricane of 1928 by gathering his family members onto a boat in the canal.

Geography

South Bay is located at  (26.666487, –80.718985), near the southern bank of Lake Okeechobee.

The Lake Okeechobee Scenic Trail runs through South Bay.

Climate

Demographics

2020 census

As of the 2020 United States census, there were 4,860 people, 475 households, and 341 families residing in the city.

2000 census
As of the census of 2000, there were 3,859 people, 805 households, and 644 families residing in the city. The racial makeup of the city was 12.5% White (non-Hispanic), 66.93% Black or African American, 19.56% Hispanic or Latino of any race, 0.29% Native American, 0.26% Asian, 0.03% Pacific Islander, 5.83% from other races, and 2.44% from two or more races.

There were 805 households, out of which 41.7% had children under the age of 18 living with them, 39.5% were married couples living together, 32.0% had a female householder with no husband present, and 20.0% were non-families. 15.8% of all households were made up of individuals, and 4.7% had someone living alone who was 65 years of age or older.  The average household size was 3.39 and the average family size was 3.76.

In the city, the population was spread out, with 27.0% under the age of 18, 9.3% from 18 to 24, 37.3% from 25 to 44, 20.4% from 45 to 64, and 6.0% who were 65 years of age or older.  The median age was 32 years. For every 100 females, there were 172.5 males.  For every 100 females age 18 and over, there were 210.6 males.

The median income for a household in the city was $23,558, and the median income for a family was $26,944. Males had a median income of $21,087 versus $22,321 for females. The per capita income for the city was $9,126.  About 29.2% of families and 36.7% of the population were below the poverty line, including 48.4% of those under age 18 and 27.4% of those age 65 or over.

As of 2000, speakers of English made up 77.76% of all residents, while Spanish comprised 21.51%, and French as a mother tongue accounted for 0.72% of the population.

Infrastructure

Transportation
Two major roads, East-West State Road 80 and North-South U.S. 27 intersect in the town.

Notable people

 Clarence E. Anthony, mayor, 1984 to 2008

References

External links
 
 City of South Bay Florida Portal style website, Government, Business, Library, Recreation and more
 City-Data.com Comprehensive Statistical Data and more about South Bay
 ePodunk Profile for South Bay

Cities in Palm Beach County, Florida
Cities in Florida
Populated places on Lake Okeechobee